Problematica can be:
 A substitute for a taxon, used for organisms whose classification cannot be decided: See incertae sedis
 The second part of the binomial name of various species